Human is the debut studio album by British singer and songwriter Rag'n'Bone Man. It was released on 10 February 2017 through Columbia Records and features his breakthrough single of 2016, entitled "Human". It debuted at number one on the UK Albums Chart with sales of 117,000, making it the fastest-selling debut album by a male artist during the 2010s.

Critical reception

Human has been given a Metacritic score of 64 based on 14 reviews, indicating "generally favorable reviews". Leonie Cooper of NME gave the album a positive review stating, "Rory Graham's debut album is at once modern and classic, fusing blues, hip-hop and vintage sounds with a pop attitude". Kitty Empire of The Guardian gave the album a positive review stating, "So it's a good job that Rag'n'Bone Man has the kind of righteous roar that could breathe life into the phone book," but criticised Graham, saying, “this album spools together a set of reliable tropes with little in the way of topspin."

Commercial performance
On 13 February 2017, the album was number one on The Official Chart Update, the album sold 70,000 copies and was outselling the top 20 combined. The album entered the UK Albums Chart on 17 February 2017 at number one. The album sold 117,000 copies across physical, download and streaming, making it the fastest-selling debut album by a male act during the 2010s. The album also reached number one in Belgium, the Czech Republic, the Netherlands, Ireland and Switzerland.

In France, it started at number two with 16,738 sales. It reached number one two weeks later. By the end of the year, 239,300 copies had been sold in the country. It was ranked twelve on the year-end album sales chart. Including streaming, the album was ranked eight on the year-end album chart with 310,000 units. As of February 2018, it had sold 250,000 copies.

Track listing

Charts

Weekly charts

Year-end charts

Decade-end charts

Certifications

Release history

References

2017 debut albums
Rag'n'Bone Man albums
Columbia Records albums
Albums produced by Two Inch Punch
Albums produced by Johnny McDaid